Ryocalanidae is a family of crustaceans belonging to the order Calanoida.

Genera:
 Ryocalanus Tanaka, 1956
 Yrocalanus Renz, Markhaseva & Schulz, 2012

References

Calanoida